The Off-Road Motorsports Hall of Fame is a hall of fame dedicated to notable competitors and contributors of off-road racing in North America. It was located inside Terrible's Hotel & Casino which closed in 2020.

History
In 1966, Ed Pearlman co-founded the first exclusively off-road racing organization, called the National Off-Road Racing Association (NORRA). The first event by NORRA (1967) was called the Mexican 1000 Rally, which was later renamed the Baja 1000.

Pearlman stopped promoting the series in 1976, so he decided to recognize contributors to the sport. He inducted the first sixteen members in the hall of fame in January 1978. He inducted a second group in 1980. He was unable to come up with a site to host the hall of fame.

Pearlman sold the series in 1995 to Rod Hall. While looking through Pearlman's boxes, Hall noticed Pearlman's notes about the hall of fame. Hall talked with Gordon Horsley of the National Automobile Museum, and the Hall of Fame became a resident in the National Automobile Museum.

Categories of inductees
Competition: motorcycles and ATVs, off-road racing, rally, rock crawling and sand sports
Recreation: four wheeling, motorcycles and ATV's
Pioneer: advocates, industry, and journalism

Notable inductees

Don Amador (2016)
Edo Ansaloni  (2007)
David Ashley  (2014) - Baja 1000 overall winner
Larry Bergquist  (2013)
Ron Bishop  (2011)
Herman Booy  (2004)
Carla Boucher  (2004)
Peter K. Brown  (2010)
William A. (Bill) Bryan  (2007)
John Buffum  (2004)
Harry Buschert  (1980) - CA4WDC founder
Jean Calvin  (2004)
Shannon Campbell  (2015)
Dick Cepek  (1978) - parts manufacturer
Bob Chandler  (2013)
Eugene A. (Gene) Chappie  (2010)
Brian Chuchua  (1978) - Riverside Grand Prix promoter
Chris Collard  (2015)
Clark Collins  (2006)
Pete Condos  (1978) - NORRA co-founder and Mint 500 promoter
Frank DeAngelo  (2013)
Roy Denner  (2012)
Edward Dunkley  (2004)
Bud Ekins  (1980) - Baja run record
Charley Erickson  (1978) - F.A.I.R. founder
Manny Esquerra  (2008)
Walker Evans  (2004) - Baja 1000 overall winner and MTEG champion
Bud Feldkamp (2016) - Baja 1000 overall winner
Marty Fiolka  (2014)
Sal Fish  (2006)
Jack Flannery  (2009)
Casey Folks  (2012)
Don Francisco  (1978) - NORRA co-founder
Nye Frank  (2014)
James Garner (1978) - celebrity racer
Michael Gaughan  (2015)
Gilmon (Gil) George  (2007)
Robby Gordon (2019) - Baja 1000 overall winner and MTEG champion
Chris Haines  (2010)
Rod Hall  (2005) - Baja 1000 overall winner
Bob Ham  (2006)
Jerry Herbst  (2013) - Primm 300
Vic Hickey  (1978) - racecar designer
David Higgins (2019) - Rally America overall champion
Johnny Johnson  (2010) - Baja 1000 overall winner
Parnelli Jones (1978) - Baja 1000 overall winner
Richard (Dick) Landfield  (2007)
John Lawlor  (1980) - magazine writer
Curt LeDuc  (2015) - Primm 300 overall winner
Walter B. Lott  (2007)
Rob MacCachren  (2011) - Baja 1000 overall winner and LOORRS Pro 2 champion
Joe MacPherson  (2008)
Corky McMillin  (2006)
Scott McKenzie  (2005)
Steve McQueen (1978) - celebrity racer
Roger Mears (2020) - MTEG champion
Sue Mead  (2007)
Bruce Meyers  (1978) - racecar designer
Akton (Ak) Miller  (2005)
Drino Miller  (1978) - Baja 1000 overall winner
Larry Minor  (2005) - Baja 1000 overall winner
Ray Moon  (1980) - CA4WDC executive
Jim Ober (2016)
Ed Pearlman (1978) - NORRA co-founder
Jerry Penhall  (2015)
Rick Péwé  (2010)
Larry Ragland (2016) - Baja 1000 overall winner
J.N. Roberts  (2009)
Larry Roeseler  (2012)
Nico Saad  (2008)
Bill Sanders  (2014)
Judy J. Smith  (2008)
Malcolm Smith  (1978) - Baja 1000 overall winner
Mark Smith  (1980) - Jamboree promoter
Harold Soens  (2009)
Roy Spuhler  (2005)
Cameron Steele (2018)
Bob Steinberger  (2013)
Ivan Stewart  (2006) - Baja 1000 overall winner and MTEG champion
Bill Stroppe  (1978) - Baja 1000 overall winner and racecar designer
Mickey Thompson  (2007) - SCORE and MTEG founder
Tracy Valenta (2016)
Frank “Scoop” Vessels  (2007)
Ed Waldheim  (2005)
Thurston Warn  (1978) - parts manufacturer
Vic Wilson  (1978) - Baja 1000 overall winner and Saddleback Park founder

References

External links
Official website
Hall of Fame History

Off-road racing
Auto racing museums and halls of fame
Halls of fame in Nevada
Sports in Reno, Nevada
Awards established in 1976